General elections were held in Luxembourg on 18 June 1989. The Christian Social People's Party remained the largest party, winning 22 of the 60 seats in the Chamber of Deputies. It continued the coalition government with the Luxembourg Socialist Workers' Party.

Results

References

Chamber of Deputies (Luxembourg) elections
Legislative election, 1989
Luxembourg
History of Luxembourg (1945–present)
June 1989 events in Europe